The University of Maryland, Baltimore County College of Natural and Mathematical Sciences focuses in the areas of life science, including Biology, Chemistry, Biochemistry, Mathematics, Statistics, Marine Biology, and Physics.

Departments
 Biological Sciences 
 Chemistry and Biochemistry 
 Mathematics and Statistics 
 Marine Biotechnology
 Physics

Centers and Institutes
 Center for Space Science and Technology (CSST) 
 Institute of Fluorescence 
 Joint Center for Earth Systems Technology (JCET)
 Goddard Earth Sciences and Technology Center (GEST)
 Center for Advanced Study of Photonics Research (CASPR)
 Joint Center for Astrophysics (JCA).

References

External links
 College of Natural and Mathematical Sciences Homepage
 Departmental Directory
 University of Maryland, Baltimore County Homepage

College of Natural and Mathematical Sciences
Natural and Mathematical Sciences
Educational institutions established in 1966